This is a list of James Bond Jr. episodes, an animated series based on the nephew of the fictional spy James Bond.

Episodes

See also 
 Outline of James Bond

References

External links 

Jr. episodes
James Bond Jr.